The 1948 Jacksonville State Gamecocks football team represented Jacksonville State Teachers College (now known as Jacksonville State University) as a member of the Alabama Intercollegiate Conference (AIC) during the 1948 college football season. Led by third-year head coach Don Salls, the Gamecocks compiled an overall record of 8–1–1 with a mark of 4–0 in conference play, and finished as AIC champion.

Schedule

References

Jacksonville State
Jacksonville State Gamecocks football seasons
Alabama Collegiate Conference football champion seasons
Jacksonville State Gamecocks football